Brooksville is a city in and the county seat of Hernando County, Florida, United States. As of the 2010 census it had a population of 7,719, up from 7,264 at the 2000 census. Brooksville is home to historic buildings and residences, including the homes of former Florida Governor William Sherman Jennings and football player Jerome Brown. It is part of the Tampa-St. Petersburg-Clearwater, Florida Metropolitan Statistical Area.

Brooksville, established in 1856 by the merger of the towns of Melendez and Pierceville, took its name to honor and show support for Preston Brooks, a pro-slavery congressman from South Carolina who caned and seriously injured Massachusetts Senator and abolitionist Charles Sumner.

Geography

Brooksville is known for its rolling topography with elevations ranging from 100 ft to 180 ft. The highest elevation in the area is Chinsegut Hill, at 269 ft, over five and a half miles north of the city.

Climate

Demographics

As of Census 2010, there were 7,719 people, 3,504 households, and 1,927 families residing in the city. The racial makeup of the city was 78.7% White, 19.1% African American, 1% Native American, 1.2% Asian, 2.1% from other races, and 2.1% from two or more races. Hispanic or Latino of any race were 6.6% of the population, and Native Hawaiian and Other Pacific Islander composed 0.2% of the population.

There were 3,220 households, out of which 23.7% had children under the age of 18 living with them, 39.9% were married couples living together, 14.0% had a female householder with no husband present, and 43.1% were non-families. 38.5% of all households were made up of individuals, and 19.1% had someone living alone who was 65 years of age or older. The average household size was 2.14 and the average family size was 2.82.

In the city, 22.1% of people were under the age of 18, 7.8% from 18 to 24, 21.7% from 25 to 44, 18.7% from 45 to 64, and 29.7% were 65 years of age or older. The median age was 44 years. For every 100 females, there were 80.2 males. For every 100 females age 18 and over, there were 76.4 males.

Economy

Personal income
The median income for a household in the city was $25,489, and the median income for a family was $31,060. Males had a median income of $29,837 versus $21,804 for females. The per capita income for the city was $16,265. About 16.8% of families and 21.5% of the population were below the poverty line, including 27.9% of those under age 18 and 11.5% of those age 65 or over.

Tourism
The city hosted an annual Blueberry Festival in downtown Brooksville until 2017. The Festival then moved to Plant City.

The city has historic homes along brick streets. There is also a Native American outpost in a log cabin, the Brooksville Railroad Depot Museum, and The Hernando Heritage Museum, located in the May-Stringer House. The Historic Brooksville Walking/Driving Tour features many historic homes; a guidebook is available at the City of Brooksville website and at the main library on Howell Avenue.

The first annual "Get Healthy Brooksville Cycling Classic" was held in 2010 and attracted cyclists from all over the state.

The Brooksville Business Alliance has sponsored the annual Brooksville Founders Week Celebration since 2006. There is a monthly live music performance, antique car show, and other events.

History

19th century

Fort DeSoto, established about 1840 to give protection to settlers from Native Americans, was located at the northeastern edge of present-day Brooksville on Croom Road about one-half mile east of U.S. Highway 41. The fort was also a trading post and a regular stop on the Concord stagecoach line which ran from Palatka to Tampa.

The fort was built on top of a heavy bed of limestone, a fact which they were unaware of at the time. This made it exceedingly difficult to obtain water, thus causing the location to be abandoned.

On September 12, 1842, Seminole Indians attacked the McDaniel party which was riding near the settlement known as "Chocochatti" or "Chocachatti", south of Brooksville, killing Mrs. Charlotte Crum ( Winn/Wynn; 1792–1842).

Brooksville was settled in 1845 by four families: the Howell family which settled the northern part of town; the Mays family which settled the eastern part of town; the Hale family on the west; and the Parsons family on the south.

In 1850 a post office was established at Melendez, which in 1855 was listed as the Capital of Benton County, now Hernando County. In 1854 it was replaced by a post office at Pierceville. Both towns were situated in the area that would become Brooksville.

In 1856, the town of Brooksville was established by the merger of the towns of Melendez and Pierceville and served as the county seat of Hernando County. The name was chosen to honor Preston Brooks, a congressman who had caned abolitionist Senator Charles Sumner nearly to death in 1856 on the floor of the Senate after Sumner gave an anti-slavery speech and disparaged Brooks' uncle, Senator Andrew Butler.

The Pierceville post office was renamed Brooksville in 1871. The city of Brooksville was incorporated on October 13, 1880.

A study of lynchings recorded in Hernando County in the late 19th and early 20th centuries revealed it had one of the highest per capita rates of violence against blacks in the United States. In Brooksville, the county seat, several African-Americans were killed in the 1870s and 1920s. Arthur St. Clair, a community leader, was murdered in 1877 after he presided over an interracial marriage. After the murder, the investigation was stymied by local actions to prevent bringing to justice the white men accused in his killing.

Around 1885, there was a brief uprising by blacks, three of whom were killed and many others wounded by whites.

20th century 
The 1920s saw a resurgence of Ku Klux Klan activity and lynchings; as a result, many black residents left the area. During the Great Depression, Brooksville suffered from a lack of currency. The school board paid teachers with chits, and Weeks Hardware "accepted chickens and sides of bacon" as payment.

In the 1920s, Brooksville was a major citrus production area and was known as the "Home of the Tangerine".

In 1948, Brooksville instituted a zoning law segregating neighborhoods. Schools remained segregated until the late 1960s.

One of the most notorious examples of racism in the city was the creation of the "Lewis Plantation and Turpentine Still", which claimed to show life in African-American rural communities, but in reality contained black residents dressing and acting in grotesque stereotypes as a means of entertaining white tourists.

21st century
Brooksville is a residential-commercial community. There are several modern medical facilities in the area including Bayfront Health Brooksville, Oak Hill Community Hospital, and Bayfront Health Spring Hill. A campus of Pasco–Hernando State College is a mile north of the city limits. There are three city parks with walking trails, sports, and picnicking facilities, including a nine-hole golf course.

Jerome Brown, defensive tackle for the Philadelphia Eagles was a graduate of Brooksville's Hernando High School. In June 1988, he received praise for his calm demeanor as he helped disperse a group of Ku Klux Klan protesters in Brooksville. Brown, and his 12-year-old nephew Gus, died on June 25, 1992, after Brown lost control of his car and crashed into a tree; Brown was 27 years old. In 2000, the Jerome Brown Community Center was opened in Brooksville in memory of Brown.

A minor controversy arose in the summer of 2010 when local media and residents brought attention to the origin of the town's name, calling it "shameful". The suggestion was made that the town should change its name in order to distance itself from its pro-slavery history. The idea was opposed by locals and not entertained by the city council. However, the city's official website did remove a page which discussed the Brooks/Sumner encounter and had cast Brooks in a positive light.

Public transportation
Brooksville is served by THE Bus's Purple and Green Routes.

Media
 WWJB (1450 AM), radio station based in Brooksville
 The Hernando Times, an issue of the Tampa Bay Times, is published each Friday.

Notable people
 Tammy Alexander, murder victim known as "Caledonia Jane Doe", disappeared from Brooksville in 1979
 Bronson Arroyo, Major League Baseball pitcher; pitched for Hernando High School and graduated in 1995
 Jerome Brown, defensive tackle for the Philadelphia Eagles of the National Football League
 John Capel, sprinter and professional football player
 Paul Farmer, co-founder of international social justice and health organization Partners In Health
 Wayne Garrett, Major League Baseball infielder, member of the 1969 "Miracle Mets"
 Mike Hampton, Major League Baseball player for the Houston Astros; born in Brooksville
 DuJuan Harris, former Central High (Brooksville) standout and current running back for the Jacksonville Jaguars
 William Sherman Jennings, governor of Florida 1901–1905
 George Lowe, television actor, grew up in Brooksville, worked for WWJB AM 1450, a local radio station
 Bill McCollum, U.S. congressman and Florida Attorney General; birthplace and childhood home
 Maulty Moore, former NFL defensive tackle for the Miami Dolphins, Cincinnati Bengals, and Tampa Bay Buccaneers
 Tori Murden, the first woman to row solo across the Atlantic Ocean, and to ski to the geographic South Pole
 Jon Oliva, Savatage frontman and Trans-Siberian Orchestra composer
 Todd Rogers, retired professional videogame player
 Taylor Rotunda, former WWE wrestler, better known as Bo Dallas
 Windham Rotunda, former WWE wrestler, better known as Bray Wyatt
 Stephen M. Sparkman, a member of the U.S. House of Representatives from Florida; born on a farm in Hernando County just south of Brooksville on July 29, 1849
 Donald Sanborn, a sedevacantist Catholic Bishop; currently lives at Most Holy Trinity Seminary, in Brooksville
 Hughie Thomasson, guitarist, songwriter, lead vocalist and leader of the Outlaws; lived in Brooksville

Cultural
 Canadian director Bob Clark's 1974 horror film Deathdream (aka Dead of Night; The Night Andy Came Home) was filmed entirely in Brooksville.

References

External links

 
County seats in Florida
Cities in Hernando County, Florida
Cities in the Tampa Bay area
Cities in Florida
1856 establishments in Florida
Populated places established in 1856
Communities named for Preston Brooks